Balbir Singh is an Indian politician from Punjab, who belongs to Aam Aadmi Party. He has taken the oath of cabinet minister of Punjab and given the portfolio of Health and Family Welfare, Medical Education and Research and Elections on 7th January 2023.

Early life
Before entering politics, he retired as Associate Professor and is presently working as an Eye Surgeon at Patiala. He did his MBBS from Punjab University, Chandigarh in the year of 1979.

He also participated, at the young age, in JP Movement in 1974 and in 2011 Indian anti-corruption movement. Before 2014 Indian general election  he joined Aam Aadmi Party.

Political career
He served as the caretaker Convener of Aam Aadmi Party of Punjab after Party’s National Convener Arvind Kejriwal's apology from Bikram Singh Majithia. After the apology, both the Convener and Co-Convener of Party, Bhagwant Mann and Aman Arora respectively, resigned from their posts. Upon this, Balbir Singh was appointed the Co-convener and caretaker Convener of Party’s Punjab unit.

In 2017 Punjab Legislative Assembly election, Party announced him as candidate against Amarinder Singh from Patiala Rural Assembly constituency but he lost and stood at second place with more than 20,000 votes.

Member of Legislative Assembly
He represents the Patiala Rural Assembly constituency as MLA in Punjab Assembly. The Aam Aadmi Party gained a strong 79% majority in the sixteenth Punjab Legislative Assembly by winning 92 out of 117 seats in the 2022 Punjab Legislative Assembly election. MP Bhagwant Mann was sworn in as Chief Minister on 16 March 2022.

Committee assignments of Punjab Legislative Assembly
Member (2022–23) Committee on Privileges
Member (2022–23) Committee on Local Bodies

Electoral performance

References 

Aam Aadmi Party politicians from Punjab, India
1957 births
Living people
Punjab, India MLAs 2022–2027
Aam Aadmi Party candidates in the 2017 Punjab Legislative Assembly election